Littleville Lake is located mostly in the town of Chester in Hampden County and partly in the town of Huntington in Hampshire County, Massachusetts.  It was created by the US Army Corps of Engineers when the Middle Branch of the Westfield River was dammed to control flooding.

External links

USACE: Littleville Lake

Reservoirs in Massachusetts
Lakes of Hampden County, Massachusetts
Lakes of Hampshire County, Massachusetts
Buildings and structures in Hampden County, Massachusetts
Buildings and structures in Hampshire County, Massachusetts
Protected areas of Hampden County, Massachusetts
Protected areas of Hampshire County, Massachusetts